Amphipyrinae is a subfamily of owlet moths in the family Noctuidae. There are more than 50 genera and 210 described species in Amphipyrinae, although the classifications are likely to change over time.

This subfamily has been used as a catchall for members of Noctuidae that don't fit well into other subfamilies. As such, many of its members lack morphological traits that would allow assignment into one of the other subfamilies. Genetic analysis conducted on Amphipyrinae is improving the classification of these genera.

In 2021, phylogenetic research resulted in 11 genera being transferred from Amphipyrinae to six different subfamilies, and it is expected that more members of Amphipyrinae will be reassigned as further research is done.

Psaphidini is included here as a tribe, but is sometimes treated as the subfamily Psaphidinae. The Australian genera in Acronictinae are sometimes considered part of Amphipyrinae.

Genera
These 52 genera belong to the subfamily Amphipyrinae:
 Tribe Amphipyrini Guenée, 1837
 Amphipyra Ochsenheimer, 1816
 Tribe Psaphidini Grote, 1896
 Subtribe Feraliina Poole, 1995
 Apsaphida Franclemont, 1973
 Feralia Grote, 1874
 Miracavira Franclemont, 1937
 Paratrachea Hampson, 1908
 Viridemas Smith, 1908
 Subtribe Nocloina Poole, 1995
 Emarginea Guenée, 1852
 Euamiana Barnes & Benjamin, 1927
 Lythrodes Smith, 1903
 Nocloa Smith, 1906
 Oslaria Dyar, 1904
 Paramiana Barnes & Benjamin, 1924
 Petalumaria Buckett & Bauer, 1968
 Prothrinax Hampson, 1908
 Redingtonia Barnes & McDunnough, 1912
 Ruacodes Hampson, 1908
 Walterella Dyar, 1921
 Subtribe Psaphidina Grote, 1896
 Brachionycha Hübner, 1819
 Copivaleria Grote, 1883
 Pleromella Dyar, 1921
 Provia Barnes & McDunnough, 1910
 Psaphida Walker, 1865
 Pseudocopivaleria Buckett & Bauer, 1966
 Subtribe Triocnemidina Poole, 1995
 Crimona Smith, 1902
 Oxycnemis Grote, 1882
 Policocnemis Benjamin, 1932
 Triocnemis Grote, 1881
 Unciella Troubridge, 2008
 Not assigned to a subtribe
 Allomeganephria Ronkay, Ronkay, Gyulai & Hacker, 2010
 Asteroscopus Boisduval, 1828
 Benedekia Ronkay, Ronkay, Gyulai & Hacker, 2010
 Beshkovietta Ronkay, Ronkay, Gyulai & Hacker, 2010
 Copitype Hampson, 1906
 Diphtherocome Warren, 1907
 Fansipania Ronkay, Ronkay, Gyulai & Hacker, 2010
 Flexivaleria
 Gracilisinensis Gyulai, Saldaitis & Vaitonis, 2017
 Himalaea Hreblay & Ronkay, 1998
 Sirioba Nye, 1975
 Speidelia Ronkay, 2000
 Valeria Stephens, 1829
 Vigentinocome
 Not assigned to a tribe
 Bityla Walker, 1865
 Centrogone Hampson, 1908
 Eutamsia Fletcher D.S., 1961
 Exathetis Janse, 1938
 Heptapotamia Alphéraky, 1882
 Leucosigma Druce, 1908
 Mazuca Walker, 1866
 Nacna Fletcher, 1961
 Phidrimana Kononenko, 1989
 Thoracolopha Turner, 1939

References

Further reading

External links

 

Noctuidae